Florian Notz (born 24 April 1992) is a German cross-country skier. He competed in the World Cup 2015 season.

He represented Germany at the FIS Nordic World Ski Championships 2015 in Falun.

Cross-country skiing results
All results are sourced from the International Ski Federation (FIS).

Olympic Games

Distance reduced to 30 km due to weather conditions.

World Championships

World Cup

Season standings

References

External links

1992 births
Living people
German male cross-country skiers
Tour de Ski skiers
Cross-country skiers at the 2022 Winter Olympics
Olympic cross-country skiers of Germany
21st-century German people